Mukhtar Bhatti (born October 1932) is a Pakistani field hockey player. He competed in the men's tournament at the 1948 Summer Olympics.

References

External links
 

1932 births
Pakistani male field hockey players
Olympic field hockey players of Pakistan
Field hockey players at the 1948 Summer Olympics
People from Gurdaspur
Indian emigrants to Pakistan
20th-century Pakistani people